Blade, also referred to as The Blade Nation, was an underground computer artscene group that primarily released ANSI, ASCII, and high resolution artwork from 1994 to 1997, and during a brief time in 1998.

History 

The group was founded in New Jersey by ANSI Artist, Sub Zero. Due to the confusion between many artists with the handle Sub Zero, his name was changed to Mindcrime after the first Blade release.

Blade developed a long-standing rivalry with another artscene group headquartered in New Jersey, Creators of Intense Art.

In 1996 Blade took part in Canadian artscene group Mistigris's World Tour, under which Mistigris released its artwork in other group's artpacks, as opposed to its own.

Releases 
Blade released 43 monthly artpacks beginning with the first "Blade Epic" in March 1994. After the 43rd release, several months passed until the final 44th artpack was released.
 Blade Epic #01 (First Epic)
 Blade Epic #27 (Mistigris World Tour)
 Blade Epic #44 (Final Epic)

External links 
 Dark Domain The ACiD Artpacks Archive on DVD, contains all available Blade Epics.
Sixteen Colors ANSI Art and ASCII Art Archive - A web viewable archive of current and past ANSI and ASCII packs released by the computer art scene

1994 establishments in New Jersey
Artscene groups